Winter Diary: A7 Classical (stylized as: Winter diary ~A7 Classical~) is a remix compilation album by Japanese singer Ayumi Hamasaki. The album was released on December 23, 2015  in Japan under Avex Trax, and on December 31 in Taiwan under Avex Taiwan. It contains classical arrangements of ten songs personally selected by Hamasaki from her A One and sixxxxxx albums released earlier that year, plus one brand new song titled "Winter diary". It is Hamasaki's fourth classical album overall, following 2013's A Classical.

Background and release
On November 22, via social media, Hamasaki shared an in-studio photo of a new song she was working on, teasing the track's title, "Winter diary" along with the opening words to the lyrics. The photo revealed that she had written the song and Tetsuya Komuro had produced the music.

Two days later, on November 24, Avex officially announced details of Hamasaki's winter project album, titled Winter diary ~A7 Classical~, and that it would be released on December 23. The tracklist of eleven songs was also revealed, with four songs taken from sixxxxxx ("Step by step", "Sorrows", "Summer diary" and "Sky high"), six songs taken from A One ("Warning", "Last Minute", "NO FUTURE", "Out of control", "The GIFT", and 'The Show Must Go On"), and the final track being the song she had teased only days prior and the album's namesake, "Winter diary", written as a companion or sequel to "Summer diary". It was also disclosed that popular violinist Okabe Machi featured on three of the tracks, "WARNING", "NO FUTURE", and "The Show Must Go On".

The official cover artwork for the album was revealed on November 30. Audio excerpts from three of the newly arranged songs were posted on Hamasaki's official YouTube account as further teasers prior to release day, "Winter diary" on December 10, "Step by step" on December 11, and "Last minute" on December 13.

Promotion
Hamasaki promoted the album by starting an Instagram account on December 23, 2015 that initially was only to be open for one month until January 23, 2016, but currently remains active to present day. She shared pictures of the music video shooting for "Winter Diary", which was recorded in Taiwan, and also the preparations for her Ayumi Hamasaki Countdown Live 2015-2016 A: Made In Tokyo concerts where she later performed the new song.

Track listing

Personnel 
Recorded at Sound City, Onkio Haus Studio, and Prime Sound Studio Form, Tokyo, Japan. Management by Avex Trax in Tokyo, Japan.

Personnel adapted from the liner notes of the physical album.

 Hiroshi Arakawa – flute, piccolo flute
 Kohei Chida – direction (recording)
 Mariko Fukushi – bassoon
 Ayumi Hamasaki – primary vocals, lyrics
 Tomoki Ihira – guitar (track 11)
 Youta Ishizuka – assistant engineer
 Norihiko Katsumata – assistant engineer
 Hiroshi Kawasaki – mastering
 Koji Morimoto – mixing
 Hidehito Naka – clarinet
 Yuta Ohno – french horn
 Keiichiro Sato – bass trombone
 Satoshi Shoji – oboe
 Yoji Sugiyama – musician coordination
 Masaki Tanaka – french horn
 Yoshiyuki Uema – french horn
 Yutaro Wada – assistant engineer
 Hidetomo "KOME" Yoneda – direction
 Soma Yoshihara – assistant engineer

 Recorded By – Hiroshi Sato (4) (Tracks: 11), Kiyoshi Okabe (Tracks: 1-10)
 Snare – Shu Kanematsu, Shunichi Ihara, Yusuke Yoshida, Yutaka Yamada (Track 8)
 Strings – Koichiro Muroya Strings
 Trombone – Azusa Tojo, Nobuhide Handa
 Trumpet – Kai Takaara, Yoshinori Tanuma
 Violin – Machi Okabe (Tracks: 1, 7, 10), Yuko Kajitani (Track 11)
 Vocals (Backing) – Manami Noro, Yumi Kawamura (Track 11)

Charts

References

External links

Winter diary ~A7 Classical~ Oricon Profile

Ayumi Hamasaki remix albums
2015 compilation albums
2015 remix albums